Lindsay Rose (born 8 February 1992) is a professional footballer who plays as a centre back for Polish club Legia Warsaw. Born in France, he represents the Mauritius national team.

He was a France youth international and previously played at under-18 and under-19 level.

Club career

Youth career and Laval
Rose began his career in 1998 with hometown club CPB Rennes. After training there for three years, he moved to professional club Rennes. After spending nine years in the club's academy, Rose was released without Rennes offering him a professional contract. Soon after, he signed on with Ligue 2 club Laval, appearing for the club's reserve team in the Championnat de France amateur 2 numerous times.

Rose made his professional debut on 9 April 2010 in a league match against Châteauroux. On 21 May 2010, Rose signed his first professional contract agreeing to a three-year deal with Laval.

Valenciennes and Lyon
On 17 July 2014, after a season-and-a-half at Ligue 1 side Valenciennes, he signed a four-year deal with Olympique Lyonnais prior to the 2014–15 season.

Aris 
On 24 January 2019, Rose joined Aris on a six-month loan deal from Lorient. On 3 March 2019, he scored his first goal for the club, sealing a 2–0 home win against AEK Athens, in the battle for a Europa League ticket. On 31 March 2019, he scored equalizing the score in an eventual 3–1 home win against OFI.

On 29 June 2019, Aris announced the signing of Rose on a three-year contract. On 2 November 2019, he scored with an excellent finesse shot in a 1–1 away draw against Panionios.

On 4 January 2020, he scored with a close range header, in a massive 4–2 home win against PAOK, at the Derby of Thessaloniki. Fifteen days later, he scored in a disappointing 4–2 away loss against Olympiacos.

Rose impressed with his performances throughout the 2019–20 season, In late April, Aris reportedly rejected an offer from Crvena Zvezda, estimated to be around €600,000.

Legia Warsaw 
In July 2021, even though he was part of the summer pre-season preparation of Aris, he was transferred to Polish Ekstraklasa club Legia Warsaw, expressing, though, that his leave is only an "au revoir" and not a final goodbye, after stating he will return one day to the club of Aris. On 28 October 2021, he scored his premier goal in the Polish Cup game against Świt Szczecin.

International career
Rose's first international experience came with the Mauritius U-17 team in 2008, playing several games for the team in various competitions. Soon after, he was called up to the France U-18 team and, a year later, to the France U-19 team. He aspires to play for the France national team internationally, but said that he is definitely open to playing with the Mauritius national team should the former not work out.

In October 2017, Rose pledged his international allegiance to Mauritius. He was called up for a friendly match against Equatorial Guinea on 8 October, but withdrew due to an injury. He made his senior debut for Mauritius in a 1–0 friendly win over Macau on 22 March 2018.

Career statistics

Club

References

External links

 
 
 
 

1992 births
Living people
Association football defenders
Mauritian footballers
Mauritius international footballers
Footballers from Rennes
French people of Mauritian descent
French footballers
Stade Lavallois players
Valenciennes FC players
Olympique Lyonnais players
FC Lorient players
SC Bastia players
Aris Thessaloniki F.C. players
Legia Warsaw players
Legia Warsaw II players
Ligue 2 players
Ligue 1 players
Super League Greece players
Ekstraklasa players
III liga players
France youth international footballers
France under-21 international footballers
Expatriate footballers in Greece
Expatriate footballers in Poland
Mauritian expatriate sportspeople in Greece
Mauritian expatriate sportspeople in Poland
Black French sportspeople